Sajjan  Kumar (born 23 September 1945) is  an Indian politician. He was elected to the Lok Sabha, the lower house of the Parliament of India from  Outer Delhi as a member of the Indian National Congress but resigned from the primary membership of the party after he was convicted and sentenced to life imprisonment in a case relating to the 1984 anti-Sikh riots.

Political career
In 1977, Kumar was sworn in as the Delhi Councillor by prominent social activist Guru Radha Kishan. He was first elected to the Municipal Corporation of Delhi at a time when only few congressman were able to win in Delhi, and was later appointed General Secretary, Pradesh Congress Committee (PCC), Delhi. 

In 1980, he elected to 7th Lok Sabha, and was a Member, Consultative Committee, Ministry of Works and Housing in the Lok Sabha.  At the time, he was a Sanjay Gandhi loyalist and a bakery owner.

In 1991, he was re-elected to the Lok Sabha, and then again in 2004 when he won by the largest number of votes ever in India, 855,543, representing Indian National Congress in outer Delhi.  Following his election in 2005, he served as Member, Committee on Urban Development and  Committee on Members of Parliament Local Area Development Scheme.

Investigations and conviction for role in anti-Sikh riots

PUDR & PUCL fact-finding report
In 1984, a fact-finding team jointly organized by People's Union for Democratic Rights (PUDR) and the People's Union for Civil Liberties (PUCL) concluded that attacks on members of the Sikh community in the 1984 anti-Sikh riots were not from spontaneous outrage over the assassination of Indian prime minister Indira Gandhi, but rather the result of deliberate planning by important politicians of the Indian National Congress party.  The investigators found that the member of parliament who was most commonly named by Sikh riot survivors for being responsible for the attacks in Delhi locality of Sultanpuri was Sajjan Kumar.

Similarly, Sikh riot survivors in the locality of Mangolpuri nearly unanimously named Kumar as having "masterminded the violence".  They alleged that Kumar had given Rs. 100 and a bottle of liquor to each attacker in the riots.  The investigators also observed Sikh riot survivors confront Kumar directly at the Mangolpuri police station accusing him of being responsible for the riots.  Later, Kumar attempted to provide food aid to hungry Sikh survivors at a refugee camp, but the refugees refused it saying that he was behind the riots in the first place.

Delhi Police Investigation 
Prior to 2005, the Delhi Police had investigated Kumar's role in the riots. The investigation was then given to the Central Bureau of Investigation (CBI) in 2005 by recommendation from the Justice G.T. Nanavati Commission. In the subsequent investigation, the CBI concluded that there was a conspiracy of "terrifying proportion" between Kumar and the police during the riots, and that the Delhi police had systematically removed Kumar's name from all eyewitness testimony of the riots.

CBI Investigation 
In 2010, as a result of the CBI investigation, Kumar was tried for murder, dacoity, mischief to cause damage to property, promoting enmity between different communities, criminal conspiracy, and other provisions of the Indian Penal Code.  Eyewitnesses testified how Sajjan Kumar had colluded with the police and incited mobs to kill Sikhs. In 2012, the CBI prosecutor told a Delhi court that riots targeting the Sikhs had the "patronage" of Sajjan Kumar. CBI alleged that he organised anti-Sikh riots and he along with five others are being tried at court for killing six Sikh people.

Trial and Conviction
In April 2013, the Karkardooma district court in Delhi acquitted Sajjan Kumar, while convicting five others, leading to protests.  On 27 August 2013, the Delhi High Court accepted an appeal filed by the CBI against Kumar's previous acquittal by a lower court. CBI stated that the trial court "erred in acquitting Sajjan Kumar as it was he who had instigated the mob during the riots". 

He was sentenced to life imprisonment by the Delhi High Court on 17 December 2018 for his role in the 1984 anti-Sikh riots. On 18 December 2018, he resigned from his party Indian National Congress. His lawyer said  they will appeal in the Supreme Court of India.

Kumar later filed an interim bail plea on medical grounds in the Supreme Court, but it rejected it on 13 May 2020 stating he did not need to be admitted to a hospital, however scheduled hearing of his regular bail plea in July. It later rejected another interim bail plea on 4 September and said he didn't need to be admitted to a hospital, but stated it will hear his appeal after the courts resume their regular functioning which was affected due to the  COVID-19 pandemic.

References

External links
 Official Biographical Sketch in Lok Sabha Website

1945 births
Living people
Indian National Congress politicians
India MPs 2004–2009
1984 anti-Sikh riots
India MPs 1980–1984
India MPs 1991–1996
Lok Sabha members from Delhi
Indian politicians convicted of crimes
Indian prisoners sentenced to life imprisonment
Genocide perpetrators